The Wildervank class was a ship class of Fourteen minesweepers that were built in the Netherlands for the Royal Netherlands Navy. The minesweepers were almost identical to the  built under the Mutual Defense Assistance Program (MDAP), but unlike the Dokkum-class were paid for by the Dutch government. The diesel engines were also different.

Ships in class 

 ¹ = later rebuild as diving support vessel

References

Mine warfare vessel classes
Minesweepers of the Royal Netherlands Navy